Jayant  may also refer to:
 Jayanta, also spelled as Jayant, the son of Indra, the king of gods in Hinduism
 Jayant (actor), Bollywood actor
 Jayant Salgaonkar, Indian businessman, historian, scholar, and writer
 Jayant Narlikar, Indian astrophysicist
 Jayant Kaikini or Jayanta Kāykiṇi, poet
 Jayant Patel, American surgeon
 Jayant Patil, Indian politician from the state of Maharashtra
 Jayant Chaudhary, Indian politician
 Jayant Kripalani, Indian actor, director, and trainer
 Jayant Prasad, Indian diplomat
 B. Jayant Baliga, Indian electrical engineer
 Jayant Parmer, Indian Urdu language poet
 Jayant Gadit, Gujarati novelist and literary critic
 Jayant Haritsa, a faculty of SERC and CSA departments at Indian Institute of Science, Bangalore 
 Jayant Pandurang Naik (often called J. P. Naik), Indian educator
 Jayant Ganpat Nadkarni (1931–2018), Indian Navy admiral
 Jayant Shridhar Tilak, politician
 Jayanta Mahapatra, Indian English poet
 Jayanth C. Paranjee, Tollywood film director
 Jayant Sinha, Indian politician

Indian masculine given names